The Ghanta Awards (sometimes abbreviated as The Ghanta) is an award presented in recognition of the worst film in Bollywood. Founded by Prashant Rajkhowa and Karan Anshuman in 2010, the annual Ghanta Awards ceremony in Mumbai takes place about the same time as other major Bollywood awards. The awards themselves are a large golden bell that is typically used for idol worship.

INvision Entertainment exclusively holds the IP rights for the Ghantas Since 2013.

The Ghanta Awards is a live show shaped by online voting by the audience. The public can vote on 13 'worst of' categories.

The first Ghanta Awards ceremony was held in February 2011 at Tian Santorini to honour the worst in film of the 2010 film season. The last 2 editions have been held at J W Marriott on 15 February 2013 and 14 March 2014 respectively. The Ghanta Awards 2015 are slated to be held at the same venue on 8 March 2015 & 2021 (which is the last edition).

Historical categories
 Worst Film of the Year
 Worst Actor of the Year
 Worst Actress of the Year
 Worst Director of the Year
 Worst Supporting Actor of the Year
 Worst Supporting Actress of the Year
 Worst Couple of the Year
 Worst Song of The Year
 Worst Remake, Rip-off, Sequel of the year
 Worst Holier-than-thou Movie
 WTF Was That..!!
 That's Anything But Sexy

Categories for 2015 edition
 Worst Film
 Worst Director
 Worst Actor
 Worst Actress
 Worst Song
 Worst Debut
 WTF Was That! 
 That's Anything But Sexy
 Most Controversial Controversy
 Worst Couple
 Worst Miscasting
 Worst Brand Endorsement
 Worst Supporting Role
 Shit Nobody Saw

Format

Awarding process
Earlier, mainstream media film critics such as Rajeev Masand and Karan Anshuman picked the nominees and put them out for public vote on the awards' website. Voting closed a day before the event. Thousands of film enthusiasts usually participate in voting. Since 2014, the nominees have been decided by an internal team of professional writers and film enthusiasts at the company that manages the event.

Ceremony
The ceremony, typically held around the same time as other popular Bollywood film awards, is hosted by stand-up comedians of repute (the comedy group East India Comedy since 2014) and is interspersed with sketches mocking the worst film of the year nominees.

Collecting in person

Most winners do not attend the ceremony to collect their awards. Notable exceptions include Sonam Kapoor (Mausam/WTF Was That) and Ritesh Deshmukh (Grand Masti/That's Anything But Sexy).

Winners

2011
1st Ghanta Awards (2011) Nominees and Winners. Winners are listed first and highlighted in boldface.
{| class="wikitable"
|- aamir khan
! style="background:#EEDD82; width:50%" | Worst Picture
! style="background:#EEDD82; width:50%" | Worst Director
|-
| valign="top" |
 Pyaar Impossible  
 Blue
 Raavan
 Housefull
 Kurbaan
| valign="top" |
 Sajid Khan (Housefull)  
 Anthony D Souza (Blue)
 Mani Ratnam (Raavan)
 Jugal Hansraj (Pyaar Impossible)
 Rensil d' Silva (Kurbaan)
|-
! style="background:#EEDD82; width:50%" | Worst Actor
! style="background:#EEDD82; width:50%" | Worst Actress
|-
| valign="top" |
 Uday Chopra (Pyaar Impossible)  
 Himesh Reshammiya (Radio)
 Abhishek Bachchan (Raavan)
 Shahid Kapoor (Chance Pe Dance, Milenge Milenge, Badmaash Company, Paathshaala)
 Akshay Kumar (Blue, Khatta Meetha, Housefull)
| valign="top" |
 Aishwarya Rai (Robot/Raavan)  
 Kareena Kapoor (Kurbaan, We Are Family)
 Barbara Mori (Kites)
 Sonam Kapoor (Aisha, I Hate Luv Storys)
 Anushka Sharma (Badmaash Company)
 Katrina Kaif
|-
! style="background:#EEDD82; width:50%" | Worst Supporting Actor
! style="background:#EEDD82; width:50%" | Worst Supporting Actress
|-
| valign="top" |
 Zayed Khan (Blue, Anjaana Anjaani)  
 Sir Ben Kingsley (Teen Patti)
 Farhan Akhtar (Karthik Calling Karthik)
 Sameer Dattani (I Hate Luv Storys)
 Upen Patel (Ajab Prem ki Ghazab Kahani)
| valign="top" |
 Lara Dutta (Blue/Housefull/Do Knot Disturb)  
 Nandana Sen (Prince)
 Kangana Ranaut (Kites)
 Shenaz Treasurywala (Radio)
 Tabu (Toh Baat Pakki)
|-
! style="background:#EEDD82; width:50%" | Worst Couple
! style="background:#EEDD82; width:50%" | Worst Breakthrough (for the worst new actors/actress)
|-
| valign="top" |
 Uday Chopra / Priyanka Chopra (Pyaar Impossible)  
 Abhishek / Aishwarya Bachchan (Raavan)
 Naseeruddin Shah / Vidya Balan (Ishqiya)
 Shahid Kapoor / Kareena Kapoor (Milenge Milenge)
 Sushmita Sen / Govinda (Do Knot Disturb)
| valign="top" |
 Aditya Narayan (Shaapit)  
 Luv Sinha (Saadiyaan)
 Neha Sharma (Crook)
 Shazahn Padamsee (Rocket Singh)
 Sukhwinder Singh (Kuchh Kariye)
|-
! style="background:#EEDD82; width:50%" | Worst Song
! style="background:#EEDD82; width:50%" | Worst Story Rip-Off
|-
| valign="top" |
 All Izz Well (3 Idiots)  
 Mann Ka Radio (Radio)
 Pe Pe Pe (Chance Pe Dance)
 Jailhouse Rock (We Are Family)
 Papa Jag Jayega (Housefull)
| valign="top" |
 Prince (from every action movie ever made)  
 Bum Bum Bole (Children of Heaven)
 Jaane Kahan Se Aayi Hai (My Stepmother is an Alien)
 Hum Tum aur Ghost (Ghost Town)
 Knock Out (Phonebooth)
|-
! style="background:#EEDD82; width:50%" | That's Anything But Sexy
! style="background:#EEDD82; width:50%" | WTF Was That
|-
| valign="top" |
 Two hot women chasing Himesh in Radio  
 Udita Goswami in Chase
 Kareena Kapoor seduction in Kurbaan
 The Great Indian Butterfly (Aamir Bashir / Sandhya Mridul)
 Girl down on her knees from London Dreams (Salman Khan / Asin)
| valign="top" |
 The vegetarian sharks that only circled, but never attacked, the bleeding Akshay Kumar, Zayed Khan & Sanjay Dutt underwater in Blue.  
 Celina Jaitley's cleavage in Hello Darling!
 Vivek Oberoi's Bruno-inspired leather outfit from Prince
 The diamond sucking vacuum from Prince
 The baby sucking vacuum from 3 Idiots
|}

2012
2nd Ghanta Awards (2012) Nominees and Winners. Winners are listed first and highlighted in boldface.
{| class="wikitable"
|-
! style="background:#EEDD82; width:50%" | Worst Picture
! style="background:#EEDD82; width:50%" | Worst Director
|-
| valign="top" |
 Ra.One 
 Mausam
 Bodyguard
 Double Dhamaal
 Desi Boyz
 Ready
| valign="top" |
 Anees Bazmee – Thank You  
 Anubhav Sinha – Ra.One
 Pankaj Kapur – Mausam
 David Dhawan – Rascals
 Rohit Dhawan – Desi Boyz
|-
! style="background:#EEDD82; width:50%" | Worst Actor
! style="background:#EEDD82; width:50%" | Worst Actress
|-
| valign="top" |
 Salman Khan – Bodyguard, Ready  
 Ajay Devgn – Rascals, Dil Toh Baccha Hai Ji
 Sanjay Dutt – Rascals, Chatur Singh Two Star, Double Dhamaal, Desi Boyz
 Shah Rukh Khan – Ra.One, Don 2
 Vinay Pathak – Utt Patang, Tere Mere Phere, Chalo Dilli, Bheja Fry 2
| valign="top" |
 Nargis Fakhri – Rockstar  
 Kangana Ranaut – Game, Miley Na Miley Hum, Double Dhamaal, Tanu Weds Manu, Ready, Rascals
 Jacqueline Fernandez – Murder 2
 Gul Panag – Turning 30
 Bipasha Basu – Dum Maaro Dum
|-
! style="background:#EEDD82; width:50%" | Worst Supporting Actor
! style="background:#EEDD82; width:50%" | Worst Supporting Actress
|-
| valign="top" |
 Prateik Babbar – Dhobi Ghat, Aarakshan, Dum Maaro Dum, My Friend Pinto  
 Anupam Kher – Every other film
 Om Puri – Don 2, Khap, Teen Thay Bhai, Bin Bulaye Baarati
 Shreyas Talpade – Hum Tum Shabana, Teen Thay Bhai
 Tusshar Kapoor – The Dirty Picture, Hum Tum Shabana, Shor in the City
| valign="top" |
 Hazel Keech in Bodyguard  
 Giselli Monteiro in Always Kabhi Kabhie
 Mallika Sherawat in Double Dhamaal
 Charmy Kaur in Bbuddah Hoga Tera Baap
 Raveena Tandon in Bbuddah Hoga Tera Baap
|-
! style="background:#EEDD82; width:50%" | Worst Couple
! style="background:#EEDD82; width:50%" | Worst Breakthrough (for the worst new actors/actress)
|-
| valign="top" |
 Ranbir Kapoor and Nargis Fakhri in Rockstar  
 Shahid Kapur and Sonam Kapoor in Mausam
 Kangana Ranaut and Chirag Paswan in Miley Naa Miley Hum
 Kangana Ranaut and Sanjay Dutt in Rascals
 Kangana Ranaut and Ajay Devgn in Rascals
| valign="top" |
 Nargis Fakhri  
 Rana Daggubati
 Chirag Paswan
 Zoa Morani
 Sarah Jane-Dias
|-
! style="background:#EEDD82; width:50%" | Worst Song
! style="background:#EEDD82; width:50%" | Worst Story Rip-Off
|-
| valign="top" |
 Dhinka Chika  
 Jalebi Bai
 Bodyguard title track
 Dum Maaro Dum
 Chammak Challo
| valign="top" |
 Desi Boyz – Full Monty + all Adam Sandler films  
 Don 2 – every Hollywood action film
 Murder 2 – The Chaser
 FALTU – Accepted
 Ragini MMS – Paranormal Activity
|-
! style="background:#EEDD82; width:50%" | That's Anything But Sexy
! style="background:#EEDD82; width:50%" | WTF Was That
|-
| valign="top" |
 Anything involving Kangana Ranaut in Rascals  
 Ram Gopal Verma's camera angles in Not A Love Story
 Kareena Kapoor seduction in Kurbaan
 3 girls conned by Ranveer Singh's looks and acting abilities in Ladies VS Ricky Bahl
 Any time Shahrukh Khan says "Junglee Billi" in Don 2
| valign="top" |
 How Sonam Kapoor & Shahid Kapoor don't manage to exchange a measly phone number over 10 years in Mausam  
 Colourful holi song in the middle of a movie about Hitler & the holocaust in 'Gandhi to Hitler The unexplained science behind the science fiction part of Ra.One
 Ghost Rape in Haunted 3D
 Akshay Kumar going to Trinity University in Desi Boyz
|-
! style="background:#EEDD82; width:50%" | Worst Holier-Than-Thou Movie
|-
| valign="top" |
 Dhobi Ghat  
 No One Killed Jessica
 That Girl in Yellow Boots
 Shaitan
 Memories in March
|}

2013
{| class="wikitable"
|-
! style="background:#EEDD82; width:50%" | Worst Picture
! style="background:#EEDD82; width:50%" | Worst Director
|-
| valign="top" |
 Housefull 2  
 Department
 Student of the Year
 Players
| valign="top" |
 RGV – Bhoot Returns, Department  
 Abbas-Mustan – Players
 Vikram Bhatt – Raaz 3, Dangerous Ishq
 Kunal Kohli – Teri Meri Kahaani
 Samir Karnik – Chaar Din Ki Chandni
|-
! style="background:#EEDD82; width:50%" | Worst Actor
! style="background:#EEDD82; width:50%" | Worst Actress
|-
| valign="top" |
 Salman Khan – Dabangg 2, Ek Tha Tiger  
 Akshay Kumar – Rowdy Rathore, Khiladi 786, Housefull 2, Joker
 Ajay Devgn – Son of Sardaar, Bol Bachchan, Tezz
 Abhishek Bachchan – Players, Bol Bachchan
 Arjun Rampal – Heroine, Chakravyuh, Ajab Ghazab Love
| valign="top" |
 Sonakshi Sinha – Rowdy Rathore, Dabangg 2, Joker, Son of Sardaar  Asin – Bol Bachchan, Housefull 2, Khiladi 786
 Katrina Kaif – Jab Tak Hai Jaan, Ek Tha Tiger
 Bipasha Basu – Raaz 3, Jodi Breakers, Players
 Priyanka Chopra – Teri Meri Kahani, Agneepath
|-
! style="background:#EEDD82; width:50%" | Worst Supporting Actor
! style="background:#EEDD82; width:50%" | Worst Supporting Actress
|-
| valign="top" |
 Mithun Chakraborty – Zindagi Tere Naam, Housefull 2, Enemmy, Oh My God, Khiladi 786, Buddhuram Dhol Duniya Gol  
 Boman Irani – Housefull 2, Tezz, Ferrari Ki Sawaari, Cocktail, Joker
 Sanjay Dutt – Agneepath, Department, Son of Sardaar, Dabangg 2
 Anupam Kher – Chaar Din Ki Chandni, Kya Super Kool Hai Hum, Jab Tak Hai Jaan, Chhodo Kal Ki Baatein
 Rishi Kapoor – Agneepath, Housefull 2, Jab Tak Hai Jaan
| valign="top" |
 Sonam Kapoor – Players  
 Minnisha Lamba – Joker
 Anushka Sharma – Jab Tak Hai Jaan
 Shazahn Padamsee – Housefull 2
 Jacqueline Fernandez – Housefull 2
|-
! style="background:#EEDD82; width:50%" | Worst Couple
! style="background:#EEDD82; width:50%" | Worst Breakthrough (for the worst new actors/actress)
|-
| valign="top" |
 Rajneesh Duggal and Karishma Kapoor – Dangerous Ishq  
 Abhishek Bachchan and Sonam Kapoor – Players
 Vivek Oberoi and Mallika Sherawat – KLPD
 Shahid Kapoor and Priyanka Chopra – Teri Meri Kahani
 Prateik Babbar and Amy Jackson – Ek Deewana Tha
|valign="top" |
 Sunny Leone – Jism 2
 
 Alia Bhatt – Student of the Year
 Esha Gupta – Jannat 2, Chakravyuh, Raaz 3D
 Amy Jackson – Ek Deewana Tha
 Pulkit Samrat – Bittoo Boss
|-
! style="background:#EEDD82; width:50%" | Worst Song
! style="background:#EEDD82; width:50%" | Worst Rip-Off/Remake
|-
| valign="top" |
 Paw Paw Paw Paw – Son of Sardaar  
 Balma – Khiladi 786
 Fevicol – Dabangg 2
 Ishq Wala Love – Student of the Year
 Chinta Ta Chita Chita – Rowdy Rathore
| valign="top" |
 'Agent Vinod – every Hollywood action film**  
 Barfi – every classic Hollywood film**
 Teri Meri Kahaani – Chaplin meets What's Your Rashi meets Three Times**
 Agneepath**
 Tezz – The Bullet Train / Speed**
|-
! style="background:#EEDD82; width:50%" | That's Anything But Sexy
! style="background:#EEDD82; width:50%" | WTF Was That
|-
| valign="top" |
 'Tushaar Kapoor's Manboobs & Striptease in 'Kya Super Kool Hai Hum 
 
 25yr old Sonakshi being made to dance with a MUCH fitter 39 yr old Malaika in 'Dabangg 2 Anything in 'Hate Story Esha Gupta stripping naked because of ghost cockroaches in 'Raaz 3D Rani Mukherjee dancing to 'Dreamum Wakeupum' in 'Aiyya| valign="top" |
 'A love quadrangle with Jesus in 'Jab Tak Hai Jaan  'A ghost using a landline to call up Bipasha with information in 'Raaz 3D  
 Stolen gold being melted into 3 Mini Coopers and driven away to escape in 'Players Actual aliens showing up in 'Joker A pornstar being recruited by the CBI in 'Jism 2' and saving the country
|-
! style="background:#EEDD82; width:50%" | Worst Sequel
|-
| valign="top" |
 'Housefull 2  
 Raaz 3D
 Jannat 2
 Jism 2
 Bhoot Returns
|}

2014
Here's The Complete Winner List of the Ghanta Awards 2014:

Worst Film: Himmatwala

Worst Director: Sajid Khan For Himmatwala

Worst Actress: Priyanka Chopra For Zanjeer

Worst Actor: Prateik Babbar For Issaq

Worst Couple: Aamir Khan and Katrina Kaif For Dhoom 3

Worst Supporting Actor:  Imran Khan For Once Upon a Time in Mumbai Dobaara!

Worst Supporting Actress:  Ameesha Patel For Race 2 And Shortcut Romeo

Shit Nobody Saw: Sona Spa

Worst Remake: Krrish 3

That's Anything But Sexy: Grand Masti

Kuoting Krap With Karan: Salman Khan

2015

On March 8, 2015, the ceremony was held presenting the awards:

Worst Film: Humshakals

Worst Director: Farah Khan for Happy New Year

Worst Actress:

 Sonakshi Sinha for Holiday and Action Jackson

 Katrina Kaif for Bang Bang
 Tamannaah for Entertainment
 Jacqueline Fernandez for Kick

Worst Actor:

 Saif Ali Khan, Ram Kapoor and Riteish Deshmukh for Humshakals
 Ajay Devgn for Action Jackson

 Salman Khan for Kick
 Arjun Kapoor for Gundey

WTF was That!: Ajay Devgn’s genitals being a good luck charm in Action Jackson

Anything But Sexy: Sonakshi Sinha as a Boxer in Holiday

Special Sajid Khan Lifetime Achievement Award: Sajid Khan

Worst Song: Himesh Reshamya for Icecream Khaungi from The Xposé

Worst Case of Miscasting: Sonam Kapoor for Khoobsurat

Shit Nobody Saw: Dishkiyaoon

Worst Brand Endorsement: Vivek Oberoi for Swacch Bharat Campaign

Most Controversial Controversy: TOI and Deepika Padukone for Cleavage Gate!

Worst Couple: Arjun Kapoor and Ranveer Singh in Gunday

Worst Debut: Mika Singh and Shaan in Balwinder Singh Famous Ho Gaya

Worst Supporting Role: Kamaal R Khan or KRK for Ek Villain.

2016

In April 2016, the nominees for the awards were announced, with the winners being named the following month.

Worst Film
Shandaar
Roy
Prem Ratan Dhan Payo
Bombay Velvet

Worst Director

Vikas Bahl - Shaandaar
Karan Malhotra - Brothers
Mohit Suri- Humari Adhoori Kahani
Vikramjeet Singh- Roy

Worst Actor

Ritesh Deshmukh- Bangistan
Arjun Rampal- Roy'
Arjun Kapoor- Tevar

Worst Actress

Anushka Sharma - Bombay Velvet
Aishwarya Rai - Jazbaa
Sunny Leone - Ek Paheli Leela/ kuch kuch locha hai
Sonam Kapoor- Prem Ratan Dhan Paayo/Dolly Ki Doli
Sonakshi Sinha- Tevar

Worst Song

Ke dil kare chu cha chu cha - Singh is Bliing
Paani Waala Dance- Kuch Kuch Locha hai
Banno Tera Sweater (Swagger)
Daddy Mummy - Bhaag Johnny
Prem Ratan Dhan Paayo- Title Track

Worst Debut

Athiya Shetty - Hero
Sooraj Pancholi - Hero
Kapil Sharma - Kis Kisko Pyaar Karoon
Karan Singh Grover- Hate Story 3/Alone
Mandana Karimi- Bhaag Johnny

Worst Supporting Actor

Varun Dhawan - Dilwale
Pulkit Samrat- Bangistan/Dolly ki Doli
Jackky Bhagnani- Welcome to Karachi
Neil Nitin Mukesh - "Prem Ratan Dhan Paayo"

WTF Was That!

Guddu ki Gun
Dil Dhadakne Do Dog Narration (Aamir Khan)
Kattapa ne Bahubali ko kyu maara?
Ranbanka (Manish Paul and Ravi Kishan)
Shamitabh

Worst Couple

Anil Kapoor- Nana Patekar in Welcome Back
Bipasha one- Bipasha two in Alone
Karan Johar- Ranbir Kapoor in Bombay Velvet (Karan's character has a strong gay undertone)
Sonam Kapoor- Varun Sharma in Dolly Ki Doli
Amitabh-Dhanush in Shamitabh

Worst Miscasting

Jacqueline Fernandes as a Filmmaker in Roy
Ajay Devgn as an Intelligent Family Man in Drishyam
Emraan Hashmi as an Invisible Man in Mr X
Karan Johar as Gangster in Bombay Velvet
Sunny Deol in I love NY as an eligible bachelor

Most Controversial Controversy

Anushka Sharma blamed for Virat Kohli poor performance, and he replying back
Spectre Kissing scene edited for Indian viewership (Swachh Bharat Abhiyaan!)
Kangana calling Hrithik her "silly ex" and everything that followed

Shit Nobody Saw

Hawaizaada
Mr. X
Welcome to Karachi
 All Is Well
Hunterrr
Ab Tak Chhappan 2
Hamari Adhuri Kahani

The Ghanta Tweet of the year

Sunil Grover
Rishi Kapoor
Abhishek Bachchan
Hrithik Roshan

See also
 Golden Kela Awards

References

External links
 Ghanta Awards Official Website
 Ghanta Awards-2102 Official Bindass Youtube Channel
 

Bollywood film awards
Ironic and humorous awards
Indian film awards
Lists of worsts
Awards established in 2011
2011 establishments in Maharashtra